Lonely Teenager is an album by American art rock band the Residents that was released in 2011. It contains a selection of songs as performed by the band during the Talking Light tour, as well as some songs that were considered for the tour but were rejected.

A limited edition of the album was sold during the Talking Light tour, which included a 2009 rehearsal version of "The Unknown Sister" as a bonus track.

Track listing 
 "Six More Miles"
 "My Window"
 "The Unseen Sister"
 "The Lizard Lady"
 "The Sleepwalker"
 "The Old Woman"
 "Boxes of Armageddon"
 "Talking Light"

References

The Residents albums
2011 albums
Ralph Records albums